Roberto Demus (born 4 January 1979 in Argentina) is a retired Argentinean footballer. As an athlete, Robert Demus excelled at creating scoring chances inside the penalty area (colloquially "the 18-yard box" or just "the box").

Club career

Wuhan Guanggu 
On July 8, 2006, it was announced that Demus had signed a contract with Wuhan Guanggu, making his debut with the team in their match against Tianjin Teda. Despite performing well in training, Demus did not mesh well with Zheng Bin on the offensive side of the field, scoring no goals in his first five appearances. In total, he made 17 appearances and 5 goals in the Chinese Super League.

Coronel Bolognesi 
Throughout 2005, 2006 and 2008 Demus scored 32 goals in 71 match appearances with Coronel Bolognesi.

Club Deportivo Universidad Católica 
Throughout 2009-2011, Demus scored 31 goals in 81 match appearances with Club Deportivo Universidad César Vallejo in the Peruvian Primera División.

References

External links 
 LaRepublica.pe tag 
 Cortitas... 4 preguntas a Roberto Demus
 at Soccerway

Living people
1979 births
Argentine footballers
Argentine expatriate footballers
Association football forwards
Club Almagro players
El Porvenir footballers
Coronel Bolognesi footballers
Barcelona S.C. footballers
Club Almirante Brown footballers
Primera Nacional players
Chinese Super League players
Peruvian Primera División players
Expatriate footballers in Ecuador
Expatriate footballers in China
Expatriate footballers in Venezuela
Expatriate footballers in Peru